Transfusion is a remix album by Unit:187, released on March 27, 2012 by Vendetta Music.

Reception
Michael Davis of Brutal Resonance gave the album a seven out of ten and said "Transfusion is a good remix album that really does play to the strengths of not just the band's music, but the remixers themselves." COMA Music Magazine called the album "a solid work with solid remixes and it feels cohesive and well done" and awarded it three and a half out of five stars. I Die: You Die also gave it a positive review and said "on the whole each remixer does such an in-depth job refashioning the source material that there's rarely any sense of overlap or redundancy on Transfusion." Reflections of Darkness critic Kira Kalinina praised the remixers for bringing introducing lighter elements into the music but criticized the mixes for burying the vocals and for the overall lack of musical variety.

Track listing

Personnel
Adapted from the Transfusion liner notes.

Unit:187
 Tod Law – lead vocals, instruments
 John Morgan – instruments
 Ross Redhead – instruments

Production and design
 Liam Hayes – photography

Release history

References

External links 
 Transfusion at Bandcamp
 

2012 remix albums
Unit:187 albums